Gunmetal is a first-person shooter video game for the PC. It was developed and distributed by Mad Genius Software in 1998.

Plot 
The game takes place 300 years in the future. The world is completely controlled by corporations, and the concept of nation is unknown.

The player takes on the role of a newly hired security guard for the Nataka Corporation, a multi-planet organization patterned loosely after mid-20th century Conglomerates such as Siemens A.G., Sara Lee, or General Electric.

The game starts with the outpost suddenly being attacked by enemy forces from Network 53, a branch of the Argus Industrial Corporation and a long-standing ally. Later, the Argus Corporation starts creating a destructive virus, the Keller virus.

The Keller virus quickly assumes control of all other Remote-Piloted Vehicles (RPV's) and many other electronics nearby. As the player was not in the Headquarters while the infection attacked, they are not affected. Following this, a war against the Keller virus takes place. A sole remaining technician named Pamela Lang helps the player travel to wherever their assistance is needed.

After completing some missions, the player is sent to destroy the Keller core, which is inside the Argus base, in which the player finds the Keller core Protection program. After defeating it, the player goes inside the dead body of the Protection program and destroys the Keller core. Upon beating this final level, the player is awarded "Employee of the Month" and is given a video taped congratulation from the President of Nataka.

Gameplay 
Gunmetal has 26 published levels, three secret levels, four deathmatch-specific levels, and one easter egg minigame.

Between each level, the player is told a bit about the challenges in the upcoming level through mission briefing. They can then choose to visit an upgrade area where they can buy, sell, and trade weapons, ammo, and vehicle types to use in the mission. A limited amount of credits are given at the start of the game, but by salvaging destroyed enemy RPVs or earning "good employee" bonuses, the player can eventually afford a wide range of weaponry.

The easter egg consists of a side-scrolling minigame called "Gandhi Kong," done in the style of Donkey Kong and starring Mahatma Gandhi.

Game engine 
Gunmetal's game engine was developed by Mad Genius Software. It was not, as many people at the time suspected, a Doom clone. It includes realistic lighting, spotlights, direct sunlight, and partial reflectivity (for reflections in pools and other details). At the time, very few video games had all of these features. It also featured original digital music.

Gunmetal supports the full range of multiplayer options available in 1998. As many as eight players can play over a LAN or the Internet at once, and a split-screen 2-player mode is available for local and online play.

Development
The game was showcased at E3 1997.

Reception 

The game received mixed reviews according to the review aggregation website GameRankings.

References

External links 
 

1998 video games
DOS games
Dystopian video games
First-person shooters
Science fiction video games
Tank simulation video games
Video games about viral outbreaks
Video games developed in Canada
Video games set in the 23rd century
Windows games
Tri Synergy games
Multiplayer and single-player video games